Black's method is an election method proposed by Duncan Black in 1958 as a compromise between the Condorcet method and the Borda count. This method selects a Condorcet winner. If a Condorcet winner does not exist, then the candidate with the highest Borda score is selected.

Properties 

Among methods satisfying the majority criterion, Black's method gives the minimum power to the majority and hence the method is best at protecting minorities.

Satisfied criteria 

Black's method satisfies the following criteria:

 Unrestricted domain
 Non-imposition (a.k.a. citizen sovereignty)
 Non-dictatorship 
 Homogeneity
 Condorcet criterion
 Majority criterion
 Pareto criterion (a.k.a. unanimity)
 Monotonicity criterion
 Majority loser criterion
 Condorcet loser criterion
 Reversal symmetry
 Resolvability criterion
 Polynomial time

Failed criteria 

Black's method does not satisfy the following criteria:

 Mutual majority criterion
 Smith criterion
 Participation
 Consistency
 Independence of Smith-dominated alternatives
 Independence of clones
 Independence of irrelevant alternatives
 Peyton Young's criterion Local independence of irrelevant alternatives.

References 

Single-winner electoral systems
Monotonic Condorcet methods
Electoral systems
Preferential electoral systems